Cezary Tobollik (born 22 October 1961 in Poland) is a Polish retired footballer.

In July 1983, after KS Cracovia's match with Sturm Graz in Austria, Tobollik didn't join back his teammates, and stayed in Austria. Afterwards, he crossed the border with West Germany, and emigrated to Bavaria, where he eventually joined his parents in Aschaffenburg, who emigrated there from communist Poland already earlier.

References

Polish footballers
Living people
1961 births
Association football forwards
People from Mielec
Stal Mielec players
MKS Cracovia (football) players
Eintracht Frankfurt players
Viktoria Aschaffenburg players
RC Lens players
Kickers Offenbach players
Polish emigrants to Germany
Polish defectors